The 1930 British Empire Games were the inaugural edition of what now is known as the Commonwealth Games, and were held in Hamilton, Ontario, from 16 to 23 August 1930.

The games were organized by Hamilton Spectator sportswriter Bobby Robinson after he attended the 1928 Summer Olympics in Amsterdam as manager of the Canadian track and field team and was inspired to create a similar event for the British Empire. After campaigning for the idea among contacts he met at the Olympics, he was asked to organise the first British Empire Games in Hamilton.

The events included athletics, boxing, lawn bowls, rowing, swimming, and wrestling. Women competed only in aquatic events. The opening ceremonies and many events were held at Civic Stadium (later renamed Ivor Wynne Stadium) in east Hamilton.

The games were opened by the Governor General of Canada, Lord Willingdon on 16 August. Canadian triple jumper Gordon Smallacombe would claim a few hours later the debut gold medal.

Sports

Participating teams

There were 11 teams participating in these inaugural British Empire Games:

  (51)
  (1)
  (4)
  (86)
  (60)
  (59)
  (16)
  (37)
  (22)
  (12)
  (50)

Medal table

Venues
Notable venues include:
 Prince of Wales Public School – Male Accommodation
 Royal Connaught Hotel – Female Accommodation
 Civic Stadium – Athletics, Opening and Closing ceremonies
 Hamilton Municipal Pool – Aquatics

References

External links
"Hamilton 1930". Thecgf.com. Commonwealth Games Federation.
"Results and Medalists—1930 British Empire Games". Thecgf.com. Commonwealth Games Federation.

 
History of Hamilton, Ontario
International sports competitions hosted by Canada
Commonwealth Games in Canada
British Empire Games
1930 in Canadian sports
Commonwealth Games by year
1930 in Ontario
August 1930 sports events
Sports competitions in Hamilton, Ontario
20th century in Hamilton, Ontario